The Wooden Leg is a 1909 American silent short comedy film directed by D. W. Griffith.

Cast
 David Miles as Harry
 Florence Lawrence as Claire
 John R. Cumpson as Father
 Arthur V. Johnson as Boyfriend
 Mack Sennett as Tramp

References

External links
 

1909 films
1909 comedy films
1909 short films
Silent American comedy films
American silent short films
American black-and-white films
Films directed by D. W. Griffith
American comedy short films
1900s American films